Al-Rifa'i Mosque (transliterated also as Al-Rifai, Al-Refai, Al-Refa'i, locally known as El-Refa'i, and in English: the Refaai Mosque) is located in Citadel Square, adjacent to the Cairo Citadel. Now, it is also the royal mausoleum of Muhammad Ali's family. The building is located opposite the Mosque-Madrassa of Sultan Hassan, which dates from around 1361,  and was architecturally conceived as a complement to the older structure. This was part of a vast campaign by the 19th century rulers of Egypt to both associate themselves with the perceived glory of earlier periods in Egypt's Islamic history and modernize the city.  The mosque was constructed next to two large public squares and off of several European style boulevards constructed around the same time.

History
The Al-Rifa'i Mosque was constructed in two phases over the period between 1869 and 1912 when it was finally completed. It was originally commissioned for Hoshiyar Qadin, the mother of the 19th century Khedive Isma'il Pasha to expand and replace the preexisting zawiya (shrine) of the medieval Islamic saint Ahmed al-Rifa'i.  The zawiya was a pilgrimage site for locals who believed that the tomb had mystical healing properties. Hoshiyar envisioned a dual purpose for the new structure as a house for local traditional Sufi relics and also a mausoleum for the royal family of Egypt. Over the course of its construction the architects, design, and purpose were changed.

The original architect was Hussein Fahri Pasha, a distant cousin in the dynasty founded by Muhammad Ali of Egypt in 1803, but he died during the first phase of construction, and work was halted after Khedive Isma'il Pasha abdicated in 1880. Hoshiyar Qadin herself died in 1885, and work was not resumed until 1905 when the Khedive, Abbas II of Egypt, ordered its completion. Work was supervised by the Hungarian architect Max Herz, head of the Committee for the Conservation of the Monuments of Cairo.

Style
The building itself is a melange of styles taken primarily from the Mamluk period of Egyptian history, including its dome and minaret, and Ancient Egyptian style pillars.  The building contains a large prayer hall as well as the shrines of al-Rifa'i and two other local saints, Ali Abi-Shubbak and Yahya al-Ansari. Because of the time taken to built the mosque, it represents historical and political revolution in Egypt.  The entrance is lined with marble columns.

Usage
The mosque is the resting place of Hoshiyar Qadin and her son Isma'il Pasha, as well as other members of Egypt's royal family, including Sultan Hussein Kamel, Sultan and King Fuad I, and King Farouk, whose body was interred here after his death in Rome in 1965. Khedive Tewfik and Khedive Abbas II Hilmi, however, are buried in Qubbat Afandina, a mausoleum built in 1894 in Cairo's Eastern Cemetery, together with other late members of the Muhammad Ali Dynasty.

The mosque served briefly as the resting place of Reza Shah of Iran, who died in exile in the Union of South Africa in 1944, and was returned to Iran after World War II. Part of the burial chamber is also occupied by Reza Shah's son Mohammad Reza Pahlavi, who died in Cairo in July 1980.  He was buried in Cairo following the Iranian Revolution of 1979.

See also
Muhammad Ali Dynasty family tree
Al-Nasir Muhammad Mosque,  royal mosque of the Mamluk Sultanate founded in 1318 in the Citadel of Cairo by the Sultan an-Nasir Muhammad.
Timeline of Islamic history
Islamic architecture
Islamic art
Lists of mosques
List of mosques in Africa
List of mosques in Egypt
List of mausolea

References

Further reading
al-Asad, Mohammad. The Mosque of Rifa'i in Cairo. 1993. In Muqarnas X: An Annual on Islamic Art and Architecture. Margaret B. Sevcenko (ed.). Leiden: E.J. Brill.
Jones, Dalu. "Va Pensiero... Italian Architects in Egypt at the Time of the Khedive.” In Environmental Design: Journal of the Islamic Environmental Design Research Centre, 86–93. Rome: Carucci Editore, 1990.
Arnaud, Jean-Luc. "Maps of Cairo and the Development of the City at the End of the 19th Century.” In Environmental Design: Journal of the Islamic Environmental Design Research Centre 1–2, edited by Attilo Petruccioli, 82–91. Rome: Dell’oca Editore, 1993.
Noweir, Sawsan and Philippe Panerai. "Cairo: The Old Town.” In Environmental Design: Journal of the Islamic Environmental Design Research Centre 1–2, edited by Attilo Petruccioli, 60–67. Rome: Carucci Editore, 1989.

External links

Al-Rifa'i Mosque
The Royal Mosque - Al Rifai (Archived 24 October 2009)

Rifa'i
Mosque buildings with domes
Medieval Cairo
Mosques completed in 1912
1912 establishments in Egypt
20th-century religious buildings and structures in Egypt